The 2012–13 Women's FIH Hockey World League Final was the 1st edition of the Finals of the FIH Hockey World League for women. It was held from 30 November to 8 December 2013 in San Miguel de Tucumán, Argentina.

The Netherlands won the tournament for the first time after defeating Australia 5–1 in the finals. England won the third place match by defeating host nation Argentina 4–2 on a penalty shootout after a 1–1 draw.

Qualification
The host nation qualified automatically in addition to 7 teams qualified from the Semifinals. The following eight teams, shown with final pre-tournament rankings, competed in this round of the tournament. These were not the rankings used to allocate teams to the pools as they were announced five days before the tournament started, but the previous update released on 30 June 2013, after the completion of the Semifinals.

Umpires
Below are the 10 umpires appointed by the International Hockey Federation:

Fanneke Alkemade (NED)
Frances Block (ENG)
Amy Hassick (USA)
Kelly Hudson (NZL)
Soledad Iparraguirre (ARG)
Kang Hyun-young (KOR)
Mariana Reydo (ARG)
Lisa Roach (AUS)
Annelize Rostron (RSA)
Dino Willox (WAL)

Results
All times are Argentina Time (UTC−03:00)

First round

Pool A

Pool B

Second round

Quarterfinals

Fifth to eighth place classification

Crossover

Seventh and eighth place

Fifth and sixth place

First to fourth place classification

Semifinals

Third and fourth place

Final

Awards

Statistics

Final ranking

Goalscorers

6 goals
 Maartje Paumen

5 goals
 Eileen Hoffmann
 Lidewij Welten

4 goals
 Delfina Merino

3 goals
 Jodie Schulz
 Kellie White
 Alex Danson
 Georgie Twigg
 Park Mi-hyun
 Kitty van Male

2 goals
 Rosario Luchetti
 Carla Rebecchi
 Ashleigh Nelson
 Georgie Parker
 Emily Smith
 Huang Ting
 Lily Owsley
 Kate Richardson-Walsh
 Hannah Krüger
 Marie Mävers
 Cheon Seul-ki
 Park Seung-a
 Roos Drost
 Kayla Sharland
 Petrea Webster

1 goal
 Agustina Albertario
 Noel Barrionuevo
 Martina Cavallero
 Anna Flanagan
 Karri McMahon
 Claire Messent
 Cui Qiuxia
 Liang Meiyu
 Peng Yang
 Wang Mengyu
 Wu Mengrong
 Sophie Bray
 Laura Unsworth
 Charlotte Stapenhorst
 Julia Müller
 An Hyo-ju
 Cheon Eun-bi
 Han Hye-lyoung
 Park Ki-ju
 Frederique Derkx
 Ellen Hoog
 Malou Pheninckx
 Maria Verschoor
 Gemma Flynn
 Anita Punt

References

External links
Official website

!
Hockey
International women's field hockey competitions hosted by Argentina